Martin Sinclair is a British sport shooter who won silver at the 2006 Commonwealth Games in the 50 m rifle prone pairs partnering with Neil Stirton. He was a member of the University of Edinburgh Rifle Club whilst studying at the University of Edinburgh. He won Gold in the 50m 3-Position Pairs even at the 1999 Commonwealth Championships with partner Donald McIntosh.

References

External links 
The 50m ISSF Championships, Scottish Smallbore Rifle Association

Living people
Alumni of the University of Edinburgh
Scottish male sport shooters
British male sport shooters
Commonwealth Games silver medallists for Scotland
ISSF rifle shooters
Shooters at the 1998 Commonwealth Games
Shooters at the 2002 Commonwealth Games
Shooters at the 2006 Commonwealth Games

Year of birth missing (living people)
Commonwealth Games medallists in shooting
Medallists at the 2006 Commonwealth Games